Mentasta Pass is a major mountain pass in Alaska, separating the Alaska Range on the west from the Mentasta Mountains on the east. Alaska Route 1 (the Glenn Highway) runs through the pass, connecting the Copper River Valley with the Alaska Highway. 

Mentasta Pass is also notable as it is the key col between Mount Logan (highpoint of the Saint Elias Mountains) and Denali (highpoint of the Alaska Range).

References

Mountain passes of Alaska
Landforms of Copper River Census Area, Alaska